Leo Turley (born 7 December 1966) is a former Gaelic footballer from County Laois.

Playing career
Leo played for the Laois senior football team from the late 1980s until the 1990s primarily as a forward. During that period he was widely regarded as one of the top players in the country in his position.

In 1991, he played on the Laois team beaten by Meath GAA in the final of the Leinster Senior Football Championship.

He began his club football career with his native O'Dempseys with whom he won underage honours and also played for the Éire Óg club in Carlow and Leixlip in Kildare

Managerial career
Leo started his management career with Fenagh in Carlow in 1997 then taking over at Arles/Killeen in Laois before moving to Blackhall Gaels in County Meath who he guided to the Meath Intermediate (2001) and Senior Football Championship title in 2003.

He also managed his native club O'Dempseys in 2004 and 2005 and since then has been manager of Confey in Kildare, Dunshaughlin, Blackhall Gaels again, Donaghmore Ashbourne and Leixlip seniors for one year. 
He is currently back with O'Dempseys in Laois where they have gained promotion to senior ranks after winning 2016 Laois Intermediate Championship.

References

1966 births
Living people
Laois inter-county Gaelic footballers
O'Dempseys Gaelic footballers
Éire Óg (Carlow) Gaelic footballers
Leixlip Gaelic footballers
Gaelic football managers